Kill Me Tomorrow is a 1957 British crime film directed by Terence Fisher. It stars Pat O'Brien and Lois Maxwell. It was made by Tempean Films at Southall Studios in West London.

The film features a cameo by Tommy Steele.

Plot
After suffering a series of personal setbacks and in desperate need of cash, reporter Bart Crosbie tries to get his old job back. But when he returns to the newspaper offices, Crosbie discovers that his former boss has been murdered. He is then offered money by the killer, a diamond smuggler, to take the murder rap.

Cast
Pat O'Brien as Bart Crosbie
Lois Maxwell as Jill Brook
George Coulouris as Heinz Webber
Wensley Pithey as Inspector Lane
Tommy Steele as himself
Freddie Mills as Waxy Lister
Ronald Adam as Mr. Brook
Robert Brown as Steve Ryan
Richard Pasco as Dr. Fisher
April Olrich as Bella Braganza
Peter Swanwick as Harrison
Al Mulock as Rod
Larry Taylor as Carson (uncredited)
Ian Wilson as Marty (uncredited)

Critical reception
The Radio Times called the film a "far-fetched B-movie...Terence Fisher directs with little enthusiasm, but it's worth hanging in there to catch the debut of Tommy Steele"; while TV Guide wrote, "it's overplayed and melodramatic but has enough intrigue to make it watchable."

References

External links

1957 films
1957 crime films
British crime films
Films directed by Terence Fisher
British black-and-white films
Films shot at Southall Studios
1950s English-language films
1950s British films